The 2009 Kentucky Wildcats football team represented the University of Kentucky during the 2009 NCAA Division I FBS football season. The team was coached by Rich Brooks, in his seventh and ultimately final season at Kentucky, and played its home games at Commonwealth Stadium. The Wildcats competed in the Southeastern Conference in its eastern division. They finished the season with a record of 7–6 and 3–5 in conference play, and were defeated by Clemson 21–13 in the Music City Bowl.

Several days after the Cats' bowl appearance, Brooks retired from coaching. He was immediately replaced by offensive coordinator Joker Phillips, who had agreed in 2008 to be Brooks' designated successor.

Preseason and postseason awards

PFW All-American
2009 Pro Football Weekly All-American First Team

AP All-SEC
2009 AP All-SEC First Team

2009 AP All-SEC Second Team

Preseason SEC picks
Coaches: 6th (East)AP: 6th (East)

Preseason polls
USA Today/Coaches: 42nd

Preseason All-SEC
2009 All-SEC First Team
Trevard Lindley, DB

2009 All-SEC Second Team
Micah Johnson, LB

2009 All-SEC Third Team
Zipp Duncan, OT
Jorge Gonzalez, C
Mike Hartline, QB
Corey Peters, DT

Current depth chart
As of November 18, 2009

Schedule

Game summaries

Miami (Ohio)
Pregame Line: -16.5

Randall Cobb scored a touchdown early in the second quarter

Mike Hartline threw two touchdowns to receiver Randall Cobb and led Kentucky to a 42–0 victory.  Hartline had a great first game of the season, throwing 18 of 27 for 222 yards.  Cobb caught a 27-yard pass for Kentucky's first touchdown. He also took a direct snap from center and ran 11 yards for a third-quarter touchdown. The versatile sophomore had seven catches for 96 yards.  Kentucky's defense also performed very well, picking off Miami twice and holding the Redhawks to under 200 yards of total offense.  All-American cornerback Trevard Lindley intercepted a pass in the 3rd quarter and returned it for a 25-yard touchdown.  That was Lindley's tenth career interception and his second returned for a touchdown.  The pass intercepted was in the second quarter by senior safety Calvin Harrison.  Another star of the game was the debut of junior receiver Chris Matthews.  Matthews caught a touchdown pass from Hartline late in the 2nd quarter.  This was Kentucky's first shut out since 1996 when they shut out Vanderbilt.

Week 1 SEC Defensive Player of the Week: Trevard Lindley was named SEC defensive player of the week after intercepting a pass, scoring a touchdown, and breaking up three passes.

Louisville
Pregame Line: -14

Kentucky wins the 2009 Governor's Cup trophy for the third straight year

For the third straight season the Kentucky Wildcats defeated the Louisville Cardinals and won the Governor's Cup.  This is Kentucky's longest streak since the rivalry was renewed in 1994.  Derrick Locke returned a kickoff 100 yards for a touchdown and ran for another.  A fumbled kickoff return set up Kentucky's final score late in the 4th quarter, a 12-yard pass from Mike Hartline to a leaping Randall Cobb—his former rival for the starting quarterback job. Prior to that, Louisville (1–1) had taken the lead by forcing three consecutive Wildcats turnovers.

This back-and-forth battle for the Governor's Cup wasn't won until the final 2 minutes when Louisville quarterback Justin Burke was driving for a potential game-winning score, only to have a pass tipped by Corey Peters and picked off by Sam Maxwell.  Kentucky had to punt the ball back to Louisville, but Burke's last-second Hail Mary was incomplete.

For the 9th straight season, the team that rushes for the most yards went on to win the game.  Kentucky out gained Louisville running for 168 yards to 133 yards.

Week 3 SEC Special Teams Player of the Week: Derrick Locke was named SEC special teams player of the week after returning a kickoff in the first quarter 100 yards for a touchdown.

Florida
Pregame Line: +21.5

Alabama
Pregame Line:

South Carolina
Pregame Line:

Auburn
Pregame Line:

Louisiana-Monroe
Pregame Line:

Mississippi State
Pregame Line:

Eastern Kentucky
Pregame Line:

Vanderbilt
Pregame Line:

Georgia
Pregame Line: Georgia by 7.5

Kentucky entered the game not having won at Georgia since 1977.  Kentucky jumped out to a 6–0 lead on a 20-yard touchdown pass from Morgan Newton to Derrick Locke (the conversion failed) but Georgia held a 20–6 lead at halftime.

In the third quarter, Randall Cobb scored on a 12-yard touchdown run and LaRod King caught a 21-yard touchdown pass from Newton to draw Kentucky to within 27–20.  Kentucky shut out Georgia in the fourth quarter and scored two touchdowns on Derrick Locke's 60-yard pass reception from Newton and Cobb's 1-yard run to give Kentucky the 34–27 win.  Newton finished with 137 yards and 3 touchdowns passing, completing 9 of 17 attempts.  Locke had 80 yards rushing and 2 receptions for 80 yards and two touchdowns.  Cobb had 40 yards and 2 touchdowns rushing and one reception for 19 yards.

The Kentucky defense played a huge role in securing the victory late in the game.  Kentucky defensive lineman Shane McCord intercepted a Georgia pass with just under ten minutes remaining in the game.  With five and a half minutes left in the game a Georgia quarterback and running back fumbled an exchange at the Kentucky 2-yard line and Kentucky linebacker Danny Trevathan recovered.  Kentucky had to punt but linebacker Sam Maxwell intercepted a Georgia pass with 1:45 remaining to seal the win.

As of 2021, this is the last time Kentucky defeated Georgia.

Tennessee
Pregame Line:

Roster

Roster

Statistics

Team

Scores by quarter

Offense

Rushing

Passing

Receiving

Defense

Special teams

Rankings

Class of 2010 commitments/signees

Class of 2011 commitments

References

Kentucky
Kentucky Wildcats football seasons
Kentucky Wildcats football